Fernando Montero Espinosa (died 1648) was a Roman Catholic prelate who served as Archbishop Bishop of Manila (1646–1648) and Bishop of Nueva Segovia (1639–1646).

Biography
On July 16, 1639, he was selected by the King of Spain and confirmed by Pope Urban VIII as Bishop of Nueva Segovia. On February 3, 1640, he was consecrated bishop by Juan de Palafox y Mendoza, Bishop of Tlaxcala. On February 5, 1646, he was appointed by Pope Innocent X as Archbishop Bishop of Manila where he served until his death in 1648.

Episcopal succession
While bishop, he was the Principal co-consecrator of:
Antonio Guzmán Cornejo, Bishop of Tui (1640); 
Domingo Ramírez de Arellano, Bishop of Chiapas (1641); 
Pedro Tapia, Bishop of Segovia (1641); 
Pedro Rosales Encio, Bishop of Lugo (1641); 
José de Argáiz Pérez, Bishop of Almería (1642); and 
Juan de Mañozca y Zamora, Archbishop of México (1645).

References

External links and additional sources
 (for Chronology of Bishops) 
 (for Chronology of Bishops) 

1648 deaths
Bishops appointed by Pope Innocent X
17th-century Roman Catholic bishops in the Philippines

Roman Catholic Archdiocese of Manila